Van Wormer Library, part of the University of Cincinnati campus, is a classical architecture-style library building designed by Samuel Hannaford in 1899, and opened on May 1, 1901. Funding was provided by Asa Van Wormer with $50,000 worth of street railroad stock in memory of his late wife, who died October 4, 1878.

Renovation
In 2006, a $10.7 million renovation was undertaken, creating a new dome and improving lighting. Prior to the renovation the dome provided natural light on the top floor only, but now all floors benefit from it. Van Wormer is no longer a library; university administrative offices are now housed in the building.

References

Library buildings completed in 1901
University of Cincinnati
Buildings and structures in Cincinnati
Samuel Hannaford buildings